Dim may refer to:
 Dim, a rhinoceros beetle in the 1998 Disney/Pixar animated film A Bug's Life
 Dim (album), the fourth studio album by Japanese rock band The Gazette
 Dim, Amur Oblast, a rural locality in Amur Oblast, Russia
 Dim, Iran, a village in South Khorasan Province
 Nickname of John Wooldridge (1919–1958), British film music composer and Second World War bomber pilot
 A keyword in most versions of the BASIC programming language
 "DiM", a 1998 episode of Dexter's Laboratory
 To dim, verb that means to lower the brightness of light
 .dim, a disk image
 Corporación Deportiva Independiente Medellín, a Colombian football club
 Deportivo Independiente Miraflores, a football club based in the city of Miraflores, Lima, Perú
 3,3'-Diindolylmethane, an anticarcinogen compound
 Dirección de Inteligencia Militar, the military intelligence agency of Venezuela

The abbreviation dim may refer to:
 Dimension, a measure of how many parameters is sufficient to describe an object in mathematics
 Dimension (vector space), the number of vectors needed to describe the basis in a vector space, in linear algebra
 Diminished triad, a dissonant chord with a minor third and diminished fifth to the root in music theory
 Diminuendo, a word indicating changes of dynamics in music
 Diminutive, a formation of a word

See also
Din (disambiguation)
 Global dimming